Gillian Henrion (born 23 March 2003) is a French racing driver. He is the reigning Ligier European Series champion in the JS P4 category.

Early career

Karting 
Born in Nancy, Henrion started his karting career in 2014. His only title came in the French Karting Championship in the Cadet class in 2015 against future Formula Renault Eurocup champion Victor Martins. Henrion moved into international karting in 2016, racing in the European and World Championships with his father's team. The Frenchman remained in karts until 2017, where he finished second in the WSK Champions Cup to Ilya Morozov in the OKJ-class.

Lower formulae 
In 2018 Henrion made his single-seater racing debut with an appearance in the final round of the French F4 Championship at Le Castellet. He finished all races in the top ten, however due to him being a guest driver Henrion didn't score any points.  

The next year the Frenchman continued racing in French F4. Despite only winning one race at the Hungaroring, Henrion stayed very consistent throughout the campaign, finishing in the points in all races he contested. With four third-placed finishes the Frenchman finished fifth in the FFSA standings. Due to Victor Bernier's classification as a rookie Henrion ended up fourth in the FIA Formula 4 standings, earning him five FIA Super Licence points.

Formula Regional European Championship

2020 
In 2020 Henrion announced that he would drive for the family-run team Gillian Track Events GTE in the Formula Regional European Championship. He scored points at every event and got one podium in the rookie championship. The most notable moment of his season came at the second race in Mugello, where, due to a strategy gamble, Henrion found himself in the lead by almost half a minute, and finished the race in fourth place, which ended up being his best result of the year. Henrion finished tenth in the overall standings.

2022 
Henrion made a substitute appearance for G4 Racing in 2022, replacing the injured Axel Gnos at the Red Bull Ring.

Sportscar career

2022: First endurance success 
After a year-long hiatus from racing, Henrion announced that he would be driving for Team Virage in the 2022 Ligier European Series. He would start out the campaign in brilliant fashion, as two pole positions were converted to two lights-to-flag victories at the season opener in Le Castellet. This became the start of a dominant season for Henrion, as he would take both wins in Imola, a pair of victories at Le Mans, which came as part of the support races for the 24 Hours of Le Mans, and another two wins at Monza. Henrion failed to win Race 1 at Spa-Francorchamps, finishing second, before crowning himself as the champion prematurely by winning Sunday's race. He ended the season in style, taking both victories in the final weekend at the Algarve International Circuit.

Karting record

Karting career summary

Complete CIK-FIA Karting European Championship results 
(key) (Races in bold indicate pole position) (Races in italics indicate fastest lap)

Complete Karting World Championship results

Racing record

Racing career summary 
 
† As Henrion was a guest driver, he was ineligible for championship points.*Season still in progress.

Complete French F4 Championship results
(key) (Races in bold indicate pole position) (Races in italics indicate fastest lap)

† As Henrion was a guest driver, he was ineligible for championship points.

Complete Formula Regional European Championship results 
(key) (Races in bold indicate pole position) (Races in italics indicate fastest lap)

† As Henrion was a guest driver, he was ineligible for championship points.
‡ Driver did not finish the race, but was classified as they completed more than 90% of the race distance.

Complete Ligier European Series results 
(key) (Races in bold indicate pole position; results in italics indicate fastest lap)

Complete Le Mans Cup results 
(key) (Races in bold indicate pole position; results in italics indicate fastest lap)

References

External links 

 

2003 births
Living people 
Sportspeople from Nancy, France
French racing drivers 
Formula Regional European Championship drivers
French F4 Championship drivers
Karting World Championship drivers